John Charles Waite (born 4 July 1952) is an English musician. As a solo artist, he has released ten studio albums and is best known for the 1984 hit single "Missing You", which reached No. 1 on the US Billboard Hot 100 and the top ten on the UK Singles Chart. He was also the lead vocalist for the successful rock bands The Babys and Bad English.

Career 

Waite was born in Lancaster, Lancashire, and was educated at  Greaves Secondary Modern and Lancaster Art College (The Storey Institute). As a performer, Waite first came to attention as the lead singer and bassist of The Babys, a British rock band that had moderate chart success. The band achieved two pop hits that both coincidentally peaked at No. 13 on the Billboard Hot 100, "Isn't It Time" (1977) and "Everytime I Think of You" (1979), and a solid following of their concert tours. Over the course of five years, the band produced five albums ending with the final album On the Edge in October 1980, after which the group disbanded.

Waite subsequently launched his solo career with his 1982 debut album Ignition, which produced the hit single "Change". The Chrysalis 45 failed to chart on Billboard's Hot 100 during its initial release (June 1982) but was a top track on AOR radio stations, as well as a very popular music video on MTV as the 'new' cable channel celebrated its first full year of operation. The song was originally recorded in 1981 (with slightly different lyrics) by the American rock band Spider (which featured Amanda Blue, Holly Knight, and Anton Fig) and in 1985 was included on the platinum-selling Vision Quest soundtrack. When the single was reissued, it reached the Top 50 on the Hot 100. "Going to the Top" was released as the original follow-up single to "Change".

In 1984, Waite guest-starred on three episodes of the TV series Paper Dolls.  The shows featured his songs "Missing You" and "Tears".

His next album, No Brakes, resulted in international success. It was a Top 10 Billboard album in the US due to the smash hit "Missing You" which went to No. 1 on the US Billboard Hot 100 singles chart. It knocked Tina Turner's "What's Love Got To Do With It?" out of No. 1. For that very reason, Turner later recorded and released Waite's smash song herself. (Turner's single peaked at No. 84 on Billboard's Hot 100 in 1996). "Missing You" also hit No. 1 on Billboard's Album Rock Tracks as well as the Top 10 of Billboards Adult Contemporary chart. No Brakes sold over a million and a half US copies, yet has never been certified above the RIAA Gold standard (a record company must apply to the RIAA for such certification). Two more singles from No Brakes followed, including "Tears" which was a Top 10 hit on the Billboard Mainstream Rock chart.

The next album Mask of Smiles followed in 1985, featuring the hit single "Every Step of the Way". Another single, "If Anybody Had a Heart", was released from the soundtrack of the 1986 film About Last Night.... In 1987, Rover's Return was released with the single "These Times Are Hard for Lovers". Waite would have another soundtrack appearance in 1990 from Days of Thunder with "Deal for Life".

In 1988, Waite joined former Babys bandmates Jonathan Cain and Ricky Phillips, along with Neal Schon and drummer Deen Castronovo from Journey, to form the supergroup Bad English. In 1989, the Bad English ballad "When I See You Smile" (penned by Diane Warren) went to No. 1 on Billboard's Hot 100 and earned a Gold-certified single. Its parent album reached Billboards Top Five and sold nearly two million copies in the United States alone. Bad English released two albums before tensions amongst the members led to the band's dissolution by 1992.

Waite then returned to solo work. He released the album Rough And Tumble. He has continued to tour, such as in 2003 with Ringo Starr & His All-Starr Band.

In 2006, "Missing You" was released as a duet with Alison Krauss and reached the Top 40 on the Country Charts in the United States. Waite appeared with Krauss on The Tonight Show on 5 February 2007 to perform the song. Waite's songs have reappeared in other media as well: 2013 saw "Missing You" featured heavily in the movie Warm Bodies, and "Change" is on the soundtrack of the US movie Anchorman 2: The Legend Continues.

Lawsuit against Universal Music Group
On 5 February 2019, Waite and Joe Ely filed a class-action lawsuit against Universal Music Group (UMG) claiming the company had violated their right to terminate grants of copyright. On 3 May 2019, UMG filed a motion to dismiss the case.

Personal life
Previously a longtime resident of New York City, since 2014 Waite makes his home in Santa Monica, California.

Discography

Studio albums

Live albums

Compilation albums

EPs

Singles

References

External links
 John Waite – Official Site
 [ Discography at allmusic.com]
 Interview on Yuzu Melodies
 John Waite Interview NAMM Oral History Library (2020)

1952 births
Chrysalis Records artists
Living people
English male singers
English pop singers
English rock singers
English rock bass guitarists
Male bass guitarists
People from Lancaster, Lancashire
Bad English members
The Babys members
English expatriates in the United States
Frontiers Records artists
Rounder Records artists
Epic Records artists
Ringo Starr & His All-Starr Band members